The John Borland House is a historic house located on Market Street in Cape Vincent, Jefferson County, New York.

Description and history 
It is a -story, five-bay-wide, wood-framed single dwelling with a gabled roof. It was constructed between 1818 and 1828 in a vernacular Federal style. It has a -story ell attached to the south side that exhibits Greek Revival details. In 1937, Stuyvesant Fish donated the house to the village for use as a community center.

It was listed on the National Register of Historic Places on September 27, 1985.

References

Houses on the National Register of Historic Places in New York (state)
Federal architecture in New York (state)
Houses completed in 1828
Houses in Jefferson County, New York
National Register of Historic Places in Jefferson County, New York